Evan Harrington is an 1861 novel by George Meredith, a glowing comedy of Victorian presumptions.

Setting and plot
The second of Meredith's 'mainstream' novels, the work is loosely autobiographical in inspiration; and concerns the social climbing family (three married daughters; one unmarried son) of the recently deceased tailor, Melchisedec (The Great Mel) Harrington.

Characters
Two of Meredith's most notable comic creations - The Great Mel and his daughter Louisa, the scheming Countess of Saldar - appear in the book. Among lesser comic figures are Jack Raikes and Mr Parsley.

The love interest of the hero, Evan - who is urged up the social ladder by his three sisters - is Rose Jocelyn: she was taken as the epitome of mid-Victorian womanhood by the scholar Henry Sidgwick.

See also
Lady Anna

References

Novels by George Meredith
1860 British novels
Works originally published in Once a Week (magazine)